is a railway station in Kashii, Higashi-ku, Fukuoka, Japan.

Adjacent Stations

Lines 
 Nishi-Nippon Railroad (Nishitetsu)
 Kaizuka Line

Station layout 
The station is above ground level with 2 platforms and 2 tracks.

Tracks

Railway stations in Fukuoka Prefecture
Railway stations in Japan opened in 1924